The Svenska Dagbladets litteraturpris is a Swedish literature prize given by the newspaper Svenska Dagbladet annually since 1944.

Prize winners

References

Swedish literary awards
Awards established in 1944